CEBR may refer to

Centre for Economics and Business Research
Campaign to Electrify Britain's Railway